WangShui (1986) is an American contemporary artist. They work across a range of media including film, installation art, painting, and sculpture. They are based in New York City.

Notable exhibitions 
In 2018, WangShui participated in In Practice: Another Echo at SculptureCenter in Queens. That same year they presented a film project at Triple Canopy titled, From Its Mouth Came a River of High-end Residential Appliances that eventually went on to screen at New York Film Festival and International Film Festival Rotterdam. 

In 2019, WangShui presented their first solo exhibition at the Julia Stoschek Collection in Berlin. 

In 2021, WangShui participated in No Humans Involved at the Hammer Museum in Los Angeles and also presented their first series of aluminum paintings at Frieze New York.   

WangShui is currently participating in the 2022 Whitney Biennial titled "Quiet as It's Kept" where they have presented videos and paintings co-authored with AI.

References 

Living people
American contemporary artists
21st-century American artists
1986 births
Artists from New York City
American installation artists